The Pale of Settlement was a formally delimited area of the Russian Empire, existing from 1791 to 1917 (de facto until 1915) in varying exact borders—comprising the territories of the Western Krai of the former Polish-Lithuanian Commonwealth, the former Cossack Hetmanate, and the territories of Yedisan, Crimean Khanate and Bessarabia—within which Jews were allowed to reside permanently, whereas beyond those territories, Jewish residency was mostly forbidden. The restriction on Jewish residency was also in force in some cities within the Pale. It extended from the actual pale, an eastern demarcation line inside the Empire, westwards to the Imperial Russian border with the Kingdom of Prussia (later the North German Confederation, ultimately the German Empire), the Kingdom of Galicia and Lodomeria of the Habsburg Monarchy (later the Austrian Empire, ultimately Austria-Hungary), the Duchy of Warsaw (later Congress Poland), and finally the Ottoman Empire (later the Kingdom of Romania), comprising about 20% of the European part of Imperial Russian territory. Today this region comprises all of Belarus and Moldova, almost all of Ukraine and Lithuania, Latgale within Latvia, parts of Eastern Poland, the Romanian part of the Danube Delta, as well as a small part of western Russia. The archaic English term pale is derived from the Latin word , a stake, extended to mean the area enclosed by a fence or boundary.

Life in the Pale for many was economically bleak. Most people relied on small service or artisan work that could not support the number of inhabitants, which resulted in emigration, especially in the late 19th century. Even so, Jewish culture, especially in Yiddish, developed in the shtetls (small towns), and intellectual culture developed in the yeshivot (religious schools) and was also carried abroad. A few Jews were allowed to live outside the area, including those with university education, the ennobled, members of the most affluent of the merchant guilds and particular artisans, some military personnel and some services associated with them, including their families, and sometimes their servants. The end of the enforcement and formal demarcation of the Pale coincided with the beginning of World War I in 1914, when large numbers of Jews fled into the Russian interior to escape the invading German army, and then ultimately in 1917 with the end of the Russian Empire as a result of the February Revolution.

The Russian Empire was an almost homogenous Orthodox Christian realm prior to the Partitions of Poland and its other western conquests, which changed its religious composition dramatically. Estonia, Livonia and Courland on the Baltic Sea coast were primarily Lutheran, while the remaining extensive lands conquered from the Polish-Lithuanian Commonwealth contained was mostly Roman Catholic or Eastern Catholic, as well as a sizeable Jewish minority, joined later by the Muslims after the conquest of Central Asia, the Caucasus and of Ottoman territories. Despite the clearly religious principal purpose of the edicts establishing the Pale, aiming at encouraging conversion to the state religion of Russian Orthodoxy through relieving the converts from the imposed strictures, historians argue that the actual underlying motives behind its creation and maintenance were in fact economic and nationalist in nature to a significant extent.

History

The territory that would become the Pale first began to enter Russian hands in 1772, with the First Partition of Poland. At the time, most Jews (and in fact most Russians) were restricted in their movements. The Pale came into being under the rule of Catherine the Great in 1791, initially as a measure to speed colonization of territory on the Black Sea recently acquired from the Ottomans. Jews were allowed to expand the territory available to them, but in exchange Jewish merchants could no longer do business in non-Pale Russia.

The institution of the Pale became more significant following the Second Partition of Poland in 1793, since, until then, Russia's Jewish population had been rather limited. The dramatic westward expansion of the Russian Empire through the annexation of Polish–Lithuanian territory substantially increased the Jewish population. At its height, the Pale had a Jewish population of over five million, and represented the largest component (40 percent) of the world Jewish population at that time. The freedom of movement of non-Jewish Russians was greatly increased, but the freedom of movement of Jews was greatly restricted and officially kept within the boundaries of the pale.

The name "Pale of Settlement" first arose under the rule of Tsar Nicholas I. Under his rule (1825 to 1855), the Pale gradually shrank, and became more restrictive. In 1827, Jews living in Kyiv were severely restricted. In 1835 the provinces of Astrakhan and the North Caucasus were removed from the Pale. Nicholas tried to remove all Jews from within 50 miles of the Austrian Empire's border in 1843. In practice, this was very difficult to enforce, and the restrictions were lessened in 1858.

Tsar Alexander II, who ruled 1855 to 1881, expanded the rights of rich and educated Jews to leave and live beyond the Pale, which led many Jews to believe that the Pale might soon be abolished. These hopes vanished when Alexander II was assassinated in 1881. Rumors spread that he had been assassinated by Jews, and in the aftermath anti-Jewish sentiment skyrocketed. Anti-Jewish pogroms rocked the country from 1881 through 1884. The reactionary Temporary regulations regarding the Jews of 1881 prohibited any new Jewish settlement outside of the Pale. The laws also granted peasants the right to demand the expulsion of Jews in their towns. The laws were anything but temporary, and would be in full effect until at least 1903. In 1910, Jewish members of the State Duma proposed the abolition of the Pale, but the power dynamic of Duma meant that the bill never had a realistic chance to pass. Far-right political elements in the Duma responded by proposing that all Jews be expelled from Russia.

At times, Jews were forbidden to live in agricultural communities, or certain cities, (as in Kyiv, Sevastopol and Yalta), and were forced to move to small provincial towns, thus fostering the rise of the shtetls. Jewish merchants of the First Guild (the wealthiest sosloviye of merchants in the Russian Empire), people with higher or special education, university students, artisans, army tailors, ennobled Jews, soldiers (drafted in accordance with the Recruit Charter of 1810), and their families had the right to live outside the Pale of Settlement. In some periods, special dispensations were given for Jews to live in the major imperial cities, but these were tenuous, and several thousand Jews were expelled to the Pale from Moscow as late as 1891. The extremely restrictive decrees and recurrent pogroms led to much emigration from the Pale, mainly to the United States and Western Europe. However, emigration could not keep up with birth rates and expulsion of Jews from other parts of Russia, and thus the Jewish population of the Pale continued to grow.

During World War I, the Pale lost its rigid hold on the Jewish population when large numbers of Jews fled during the Great Retreat into the Russian interior to escape the invading German army. The Pale of Settlement de facto ceased to exist on August 19, 1915, when the administrator of the Ministry of Internal Affairs allowed, in view of the emergency circumstances of wartime, the residence of Jews in urban settlements outside the Pale of Settlement, with the exception of capitals and localities under the jurisdiction of the ministers of the imperial court and the military (that is, palace suburbs of Petrograd and the frontline). The Pale formally came to an end soon after the abdication of Nicholas II, and as revolution gripped Russia. On March 20 (April 2 N.S.), 1917, the Pale was abolished by the Russian Provisional Government decree, On the abolition of religious and national restrictions. The Second Polish Republic was reconstituted from much of the former territory of the Pale in the aftermath of World War I. Subsequently, most of the Jewish population of the area would perish in the Holocaust one generation later.

Jewish life in the Pale

Jewish life in the shtetls (  "little towns") of the Pale of Settlement was hard and poverty-stricken. Following the Jewish religious tradition of tzedakah (charity), a sophisticated system of volunteer Jewish social welfare organizations developed to meet the needs of the population. Various organizations supplied clothes to poor students, provided kosher food to Jewish soldiers conscripted into the Imperial Russian Army, dispensed free medical treatment for the poor, offered dowries and household gifts to destitute brides, and arranged for technical education for orphans. According to historian Martin Gilbert's Atlas of Jewish History, no province in the Pale had less than 14% of Jews on relief; Lithuanian and Ukrainian Jews supported as much as 22% of their poor populations.

The concentration of Jews in the Pale, coupled with Tsar Alexander III's "fierce hatred of the Jews", and the rumors that Jews had been involved in the assassination of his father Tsar Alexander II, made them easy targets for pogroms and anti-Jewish riots by the majority population.  These, along with the repressive May Laws, often devastated whole communities. Though attacks occurred throughout the existence of the Pale, particularly devastating Russian pogroms occurred from 1881 to 1883 and from 1903 to 1906, targeting hundreds of communities, assaulting thousands of Jews, and causing considerable property damage.

Most Jews could not engage in agriculture due to the nature of the Pale, and were thus predominantly merchants, artisans, and shopkeepers. This made poverty a serious issue among the Jews. However, a robust Jewish community welfare system arose; by the end of the 19th century nearly 1 in 3 Jews in the Pale were being supported by Jewish welfare organizations. This Jewish support system included, but was not limited to, providing free medicine to the poor, giving dowries to poor brides, kosher food to Jewish soldiers, and education to orphans.

One outgrowth of the concentration of Jews in a circumscribed area was the development of the modern yeshiva system. Prior to the Pale, schools to study the Talmud were a luxury. This began to change when the rabbi Chaim of Volozhin began a sort of national-level yeshiva. In 1803, he founded the Volozhin Yeshiva and began to attract large number of students from around the Pale. The Tsarist authorities were not pleased with the school and sought to make it more secular, eventually closing it in 1879. The authorities re-opened it in 1881, but required all teachers to have diplomas from Russian institutions and to teach Russian language and culture. This requirement was not only untenable to the Jews, but essentially impossible, and the school closed for the last time in 1892. Regardless, the school had great impact: its students went on to form many new yeshivas in the Pale, and reignited the study of the Talmud in Russia.

After 1886, the Jewish quota was applied to education, with the percentage of Jewish students limited to no more than 10% within the Pale, 5% outside the Pale and 3% in the capitals of Moscow, St. Petersburg, and Kyiv. The quotas in the capitals, however, were increased slightly in 1908 and 1915.

Amid the difficult conditions in which the Jewish population lived and worked, the courts of Hasidic dynasties flourished in the Pale. Thousands of followers of rebbes such as the Gerrer Rebbe Yehudah Aryeh Leib Alter (known as the Sfas Emes), the Chernobyler Rebbe, and the Vizhnitzer Rebbe flocked to their towns for the Jewish holidays and followed their rebbes'  (Jewish practices) in their own homes.

The tribulations of Jewish life in the Pale of Settlement were immortalized in the writings of Yiddish authors such as humorist Sholem Aleichem, whose novel  (Tevye the Milkman, in the form of the narration of Tevye from a fictional shtetl of Anatevka to the author) forms the basis of the theatrical (and subsequent film) production Fiddler on the Roof. Because of the harsh conditions of day-to-day life in the Pale, some two million Jews emigrated from there between 1881 and 1914, mainly to the United States.

Territories of the Pale
The Pale of Settlement included the following areas.

1791
The ukase of Catherine the Great of December 23, 1791 limited the Pale to:

Western Krai:
Mogilev Governorate
Polotsk Governorate (later reorganized into Vitebsk Governorate)
Little Russia (Ukraine):
Kiev Governorate
Chernigov Governorate
Novgorod-Seversky Viceroyalty (later became Poltava Governorate)
Novorossiya Governorate
Yekaterinoslav Viceroyalty
Taurida Oblast (Crimea)

1794
After the Second Partition of Poland, the ukase of June 23, 1794, the following areas were added:
Minsk Governorate
Mogilev Governorate
Polotsk Governorate
Kiev Governorate
Volhynian Governorate
Podolia Governorate

1795
After the Third Partition of Poland, the following areas were added:
Vilna Governorate
Grodno Governorate

1805–1915
After 1805 the Pale gradually shrank, and became limited to the following areas:
Northwestern Krai without rural areas
Little Russia or Ukraine
Southwestern Krai without Kiev, expanded in 1913 through addition of the Kholm Governorate carved out of Congress Poland
General Government of Malorossiya without rural areas
Novorossiya without Nikolaev, Yalta and Sevastopol
Bessarabia Governorate
Baltic governorates closed for arriving Jews

Congress Poland itself did not belong formally to the Pale of Settlement.

Final demographics

According to the 1897 census, the governates or guberniyas had the following percentages of Jews:

In 1882 it was forbidden for Jews to settle in rural areas.

In popular culture
Fiddler on the Roof musical, later adapted into a film, located in the Pale of 1905 in the fictional town of Anatevka, Ukraine
Yentl musical, later adapted into a film, located in the Pale of 1873 Poland
 The novels of Isaac Bashevis Singer

See also
 The Pale (English Pale) around Dublin, Ireland
 Pale of Calais, English territory in France from 1360 to 1558
 Antisemitism in the Russian Empire
 Antisemitism in Ukraine
 History of the Jews in Belarus
 History of the Jews in Lithuania
 History of the Jews in Poland
 History of the Jews in Russia
 History of the Jews in Ukraine
 Eastern European Jewry

References

Further reading
Abramson, Henry, "Jewish Representation in the Independent Ukrainian Governments of 1917–1920", Slavic Review, 50#3 (1991), pp. 542–550.
 Geraci, Robert. "Pragmatism and Prejudice: Revisiting the Origin of the Pale of Jewish Settlement and Its Historiography." Journal of Modern History 91.4 (2019): 776–814.

External links
The Pale of Settlement (with a map) at Jewish Virtual Library
The Pale of Settlement (with map and additional documents) at The YIVO Encyclopedia of Jews in Eastern Europe
Jewish Communities in the Pale of Settlement (with a map)
Life in the Pale of Settlement (with photos)
Map of the Pale in 1825

Antisemitism in Russia
Antisemitism in Ukraine
Historic Jewish communities in Europe
History of Belarus (1795–1918)
History of Lithuania (1795–1918)
Congress Poland
History of Bessarabia
History of Ukraine (1795–1918)
Jewish Belarusian history
Jewish Lithuanian history
Jewish Polish history
Jews and Judaism in the Russian Empire
Jewish Ukrainian history
Politics of the Russian Empire

Cultural regions
Disabilities (Jewish) in Europe
Society of the Russian Empire
Settlement schemes